Frederick Butt Rowe (August 20, 1937 - November 19, 2021) was a former politician in Newfoundland. He represented St. Barbe North from 1972 to 1975 and Trinity-Bay de Verde from 1975 to 1982 in the Newfoundland House of Assembly.

The son of Frederick William Rowe and Edith Laura Butt, he was born in Wesleyville and was educated at the Curtis Academy in St. John's, at Memorial University and at Columbia University. In 1960, Rowe married Sandra Maude Butler.

References 

1937 births
Living people
Liberal Party of Newfoundland and Labrador MHAs